Vladislav Vladimirovich Semyonov (born 30 April 1993) is a Russian football player. He plays for FC Yevpatoriya.

Club career
He made his debut in the Russian Second Division for FC Strogino Moscow on 15 July 2013 in a game against FC Torpedo Vladimir.
 
He made his Russian Football National League debut for PFC Spartak Nalchik on 11 July 2016 in a game against FC Kuban Krasnodar.

References

External links
 
 
 Career summary by sportbox.ru

1993 births
Footballers from Moscow
Living people
Russian footballers
Association football midfielders
PFC Spartak Nalchik players
FC Strogino Moscow players
FC Veles Moscow players